Philhelius flavipes is a species of syrphid fly in the family Syrphidae. It is found in North America. Prior to 2018, it was known under the genus name Xanthogramma, a junior synonym.

References

External links

 

Diptera of North America
Taxa named by Hermann Loew
Syrphinae
Syrphini
Insects described in 1863
Articles created by Qbugbot